Urotrema scabridum is a fluke in the genus Urotrema of family Urotrematidae. Recorded hosts include:
Marsh rice rat (Oryzomys palustris)—salt marsh, Cedar Key, Florida
Gray bat (Myotis grisescens)—Crawford, Kansas
Anolis biporcatus—Panama
Anolis olssoni—Hispaniola
among others.

See also 
List of parasites of the marsh rice rat

References

Literature cited 
 Bray, R.A., Gibson, D.I. and Zhang, J. 1999. Urotrematidae Poche, 1926 (Platyhelminthes: Digenea) in Chinese freshwater fishes. Systematic Parasitology 44:193–200.
 Bursey, C.R., Goldberg, S.R. and Telford, S.R. Jr. 2003. Strongyluris panamaensis n. sp. (Nematoda: Heterakidae) and other helminths from the lizard, Anolis biporcatus (Sauria: Polychrotidae), from Panama. Journal of Parasitology 89(1):118–123.
 Goldberg, S.R., Bursey, C.R. and Cheam, H. 1998. Helminths of six species of Anolis lizards (Polychrotidae) from Hispaniola, West Indies. The Journal of Parasitology 84(6):1291–1295.
 Kinsella, J.M. 1988. Comparison of helminths of rice rats, Oryzomys palustris, from freshwater and saltwater marshes in Florida. Proceedings of the Helminthological Society of Washington 55(2):275–280.
 Nickel, P.A. and Hansen, M.F. 1967. Helminths of bats collected in Kansas, Nebraska and Oklahoma. American Midland Naturalist 78(2):481–486.

Digenea
Animals described in 1900
Parasites of mammals
Parasites of reptiles